Aa Bhi Ja O Piya (in ) is an Indian romantic film, directed by Rajesh Harivansh Mishra and produced by Binay Mehta and Shambhu Mehta under his banner of Johar Entertainment. The film features Dev Sharma and Smriti Kashyap in the lead roles. Carl Zohan, Mukul Nag and Akanksha Sinha played supporting roles.

Plot
City educated Kaushal resides with his parents in a remote picturesque Jharkhand village. Converting his passion for Bonsai plantation into a profession, he has his own Nursery. Kalpana, a city girl from an army family, is on a research tour with her mother and driver. Their car meets an accident in a storm. Kaushal rescues and brings them home. Feelings develops between the youngsters but they are unable to express. It seems destiny had it all planned. 
But practical circumstances force them to rethink – are they actually made for each other?

Cast
 Dev Sharma as Kaushal
 Smriti Kashyap as Kalpana
 Akanksha Sinha
 Richa Kalra as Ghata
 Carl Zohan as Nabin
 Mukul Nag as Balwant Singh
 Anurag Mishra as Karan
 Piyush Singh as Kaushal's Friend
 Sima Modi as Kaushal's Mother
 Rakesh Shrivastav as Chatpat driver
 Abhijit Lahiri
 Pooja Ghosh
 Shish Khan
 Sanjeeb Dasgupta

Music 

The film's music composed by Ashutosh Singh while lyrics written by Amit Deep Sharma, Ashutosh Singh, S K Sachin, Vinod Dubey and Pawan.

References

External links
 
 Aa Bhi Ja O Piya  at Bollywood Hungama

Indian romantic drama films
2020s Hindi-language films